Royal Air Force Sawbridgeworth or RAF Sawbridgeworth is a former Royal Air Force station located  north of Harlow, Essex and  east of Stevenage, Hertfordshire, England.

The airfield was used during the First World War as a night landing ground for fighter aircraft of the Home Defence squadrons protecting London against attacks from German airships. During the inter-war period it was occasionally used for glider and civilian flying until 1937 when it became Mathams Wood Advanced Landing Ground (named after the nearby wooded area). In 1940 it was renamed RAF Sawbridgeworth after correspondence between the 2(AC) Squadron (and station) Commanding Officer Wing Commander A. J. W. Geddes and the Air Ministry in London. It ceased active operations in 1944 and, after a number of ground-based units operated from the site, was finally closed in mid-1946 and safeguarding relinquished by the RAF in May 1956.

Station history

First World War

A large field west of Shingle Hall farm was used as an emergency night landing ground for No. 39 (Home Defence) Squadron which was based at RAF North Weald in Essex and, although little used, was in operation from April 1916 until November 1918.

Mid-wars

A short-lived civilian gliding club operated from the Shingle Hall site in 1928, and the British Hospitals Air Pageant visited what then became known locally as the Spellbrook Flying Ground on 17 May 1933 to give a flying display and passenger rides in their aircraft to the visiting public. Additionally, Army Co-operation squadrons of the RAF used another area of farmland near to Mathams Wood, a wooded area to the north of Blounts Farm, as a landing ground for 'resident' field training exercises in 1937.

Second World War

After the retreat from France in 1940 by the British Expeditionary Force the commanding officer of 2 (Army Cooperation) Squadron investigated the possibility of the squadron settling at Mathams Wood ALG as no base, permanent or otherwise, had been allocated to the squadron. Thus 2 (AC) Squadron was the unit that established the location for the Second World War airfield that eventually became designated RAF Sawbridgeworth. Apart from operating the Westland Lysander on its normal reconnaissance duties for the Army the squadron was also responsible for the initial selection and training of pilots to be used by the Special Operations Executive to insert agents into Occupied France. The majority of operations from Sawbridgeworth were photo-reconnaissance missions and generally linked to Army requests for battlefield coverage, but once equipped with the faster North American Mustang Mk 1 & 1a, and when the German V-weapon programme intensified, more and more sorties were flown against these targets and various radar installations prior to the Allied invasion of Occupied France. (see Where the Lysanders were ..... for precise details). As well as 2 (AC) Squadron, who were based here between June 1940 and April 1944, with their Station Offices at Shingle Hall, many other squadrons operated from the airfield during the Second World War, all these being shown below -

Units

Details of some squadrons based at RAF Sawbridgeworth

Current use

Although cropspraying by air of the farm and other local fields was carried out by aircraft temporarily based on part of the remaining concrete perimeter track from 1959 until 1983 this was the only aerial activity carried out postwar from the airfield. A number of pill boxes and personnel shelters are the only indication that there used to be anything here to do with the military. The control tower was demolished in 1953 and the Sommerfeld Tracking reinforcement to the grass runways taken up to allow the land to be farmed again. Over a period of time the sole 'T2' and the 'Blister' hangars were removed, the last surviving Blister being blown down in the October 1987 gales (this was the hangar that Harry Roberts, a criminal who with two others murdered three police officers near Wormwood Scrubs prison in August 1966, was found hiding in after a 96-day manhunt - the longest in police history). Modern aerial shots of the airfield show the 'ghost' outlines of the reinforced grass runways, similar to what can be seen at nearby RAF Hunsdon and RAF Matching, albeit they had 'hard' surfacing. The most visible indication of the extent of the airfield is the concrete perimeter track that is still visible for about 85% of its original length.

In outlying areas to the main airfield site some of the airfield buildings still exist, such as the Sick Quarters Site that has become a small industrial estate. Other buildings have been absorbed into the land-owning farm to become agricultural buildings; whilst the Gymnasium from the Communal Site was moved into Sawbridgeworth town post-war, where it is now the town's Memorial Hall.

At the instigation of the Hertfordshire Airfield Memorials Group, who are keen to record aviation history throughout the county, a memorial to the wartime use of the airfield was erected and dedicated on 14 May 2006 at the original Shingle Hall entrance to the airfield.

See also
List of former Royal Air Force stations

References

Citations

Bibliography

 Where the Lysanders were .... (the story of Sawbridgeworth's airfields) Doyle Paul A, pub; Forward Airfield Research Publishing 1995. 

Royal Air Force stations in Hertfordshire
East Hertfordshire District